Legislative election also known as Senatorial election for the Legislature of Guam took place on Tuesday, November 4, 2008, coinciding with the 2008 United States general elections and the Guam general election. Democrats defeated three Republican incumbents: Mark Forbes, Frank Ishizaki and Jesse Lujan however one Democratic incumbent was defeated namely Vice-Speaker David Shimizu.

Guam legislative candidates

Democratic candidates
Thomas C. Ada
Frank B. Aguon Jr.
Robert L.G. Benavente
Benjamin J.F. Cruz (I)
Phillipe J. Cruz
Luis P. Duenas
Judith P. Guthertz (I)
Joseph Leon Guerrero
Tina Muña Barnes (I)
Adolpho B. Palacios Sr. (I)
Vicente "Ben" C. Pangelinan (I)
Matthew J. Rector 
Rory J. Respicio (I)
Rosanna San Miguel
Vice Speaker David L.G. Shimizu (I)
Speaker Judith T.P. Won Pat (I)

Republican candidates
 Vicente Anthony "Tony" Ada 
 Frank Flores Blas Jr. (I)
 Dennis T. Borja
 Eddie Calvo (I)
 Jim Espaldon (I)
 Mark Forbes (I)
 Frankie T. Ishizaki (I)
 Jesse "Jess" Anderson Lujan (I)
 Douglas B. Moylan
 Telo Teresa Taitague
 Ray Tenorio (I)

Primary Election
The members are elected at-large with the first 15 winning candidates are elected as the new members of the legislature. As there were many candidates running, primaries were set on September 6, 2008 for both the Democratic and Republican parties. The first fifteen candidates who win the highest votes go on to the General election.

Democratic Party Primary

Republican Party Primary

General election results
Following the primaries, there were 26 candidates vying for the 15 seats in the Legislature of Guam. The members are elected at-large with the first 15 winning candidates are elected as the new members of the legislature. 
The Democratic Party gained full control of the legislature with 10 seats, while the Republican Party gaining only five seats.

Freshman Senators
There will be 4 freshman Senators in the 30th Legislature. Four were elected on November 4, 2008.

References

External links 
Official Website of the Guam Election Commission

Legislative
Legislative elections in Guam
General election